WODE may refer to:

WODE-FM, a radio station in Easton, Pennsylvania, USA
Wode, surname

See also
Wood (surname), sometimes spelled Wode
Woad or Isatis tinctoria, a plant source of blue dye
WOAD (AM), a radio station in Jackson, Mississippi, USA